Fengdu Ghost City (originally ) is a large complex of shrines, temples and monasteries dedicated to the afterlife located on the Ming mountain, in Fengdu County, Chongqing municipality, China.

The city consists of buildings, structures, dioramas, and statues related to Diyu and Naraka, concepts from Chinese mythology and Buddhism that signify the underworld or hell. It is modeled to resemble Youdu, the capital of Diyu.

After the building of the Three Gorges Dam and the rising of the water level of the river it became separated from the city of Fengdu, which was rebuilt higher up the mountainside on the south side of the river.

In recent years, Fengdu Ghost City has become a tourist attraction. Cruise boats carrying tourists up or down the river stop at the docks and tourists are taken in vehicles halfway up the mountain. From there, there is an open-air escalator up to the complex or the visitor can climb up on foot.

The site's history goes back nearly two thousand years, at least in legends. It focuses on the afterlife and combines the beliefs of Confucianism, Taoism and Buddhism. It is mentioned in several classic Chinese works of literature like Journey to the West, Investiture of the Gods and Strange Stories from a Chinese Studio.

According to legend, Fengdu got its name of Ghost City during the Eastern Han dynasty, when two imperial officials, Yin Changsheng and Wang Fangping, came to Ming Mountain to practice Taoism and in the process became immortals. The combination of their names, Yinwang, means "King of Hell" and that was the beginning of the site's focus on the underworld. Many of the temples and shrines show paintings and sculptures of people being tortured for their sins.

According to Chinese beliefs, the dead must pass three tests before passing to the next life. First they must pass the "Bridge of Helplessness". This stone bridge was built during the Ming dynasty and is a test for Good and Evil. It has three arches and only the middle one is used for testing people. There are different protocols for crossing the bridge depending on sex, age, marital status. At the bridge, demons allow or forbid passage. The good are allowed to pass while the evil will be pushed to the water below. This is now done as a tourist attraction and performers characterised as demons momentarily stop tourists on the bridge but finally allow them across.

Then the dead must proceed to Ghost-Torturing Pass where they present themselves for judgment before Yanluo Wang. This is the second test. In this area there are large sculptures of demons.

The third test is done at the entrance to Tianzi Palace where the dead must stand on a certain stone on one foot for three minutes. According to legend a virtuous person will be able to do it while an evil person will fail and be condemned to hell.
 
Tianzi Palace is the largest and oldest building and it is three hundred years old.
 
A more recent addition is the Last Glance to Home Tower (also called Home Viewing Pavilion) which was built in 1985 and is placed where according to legend the dead could have one last look towards their home and families.

See also
 Yanluo Wang (閻羅王)
 Cheng Huang Gong (城隍公)
 Zhong Kui (鍾馗)
 Meng Po (孟婆)
 Heibai Wuchang (黑白無常)
 Ox-Head and Horse-Face Guards (牛頭馬面)
 Youdu (幽都)
 Snowy Jade Cave, a cave 12 km away

References

External links
 

Tourist attractions in Chongqing
Buildings and structures in Chongqing
Religious buildings and structures in Chongqing
Yangtze River
Visionary environments
Chinese ghosts
Hell